Margarita Valeryevna Shubina (born April 4, 1966) is a Soviet and Russian actress and director. She was awarded Honored Artist of Russia (2009).

Early life 
As a child, she studied at Art School.  In high school, she won the city competition for literature. In her own words she grew up as a daredevil and hooligan, and because of restlessness could not sit long at the painter's easel or writing table.

During her fourth year of study at GITIS on the course of Oscar Remez, Shubina received an offer to appear in an Andrey Goncharov play in the Mayakovsky Theatre. After RATI in 1987 Shubina received invitation from many theaters of the capital. However, she preferred another Mossovet Theatre production.

She made her film debut in 1984, starring in the film of Mikhail Tumanishvili  Obstacle. She then appeared in Vadim Zobin film Sunday, half of the seventh, filmed in 1988. She then took obscure roles in some 40 films.

Most famously Shubina portrayed paramedic Orlova role in the television series Ambulance directed by Anatoly Artamonov and Gennady Kayumov. Her directorial debut was Men Lived and Did Not Know.

On April 24, 2009 she was awarded the title of Honored Artist of Russia.

Personal life 
Shubina's husband, her former classmate Vladislav, was a former theater actor, and now a businessman. The couple has two sons —  Maxim and Seraphim. Maxim's godfather is Andrey Ilin, and Seraphim's godparents are Alexander Samoilenko and Vlad Sadovskaya.

Filmography

References

External links
 
 Маргарита Шубина на КиноПоиске

1966 births
Living people
Soviet stage actresses
Soviet film actresses
Russian film actresses
Russian stage actresses
Russian television actresses
Russian women film directors
Honored Artists of the Russian Federation